Hangover is a 2014 Malayalam film directed by debutant Sreejith Sukumaran featuring Maqbool Salmaan, Shine Tom Chacko and Bhagath Manuel together with martial arts expert Govind Krishna who debuts in the film, in the lead roles The film showcases four friends from different tiers of society and how despite their devil-may-care personas rise up to tackle an incident in their lives. Archana Gupta and Shritha Sivadas play the heroines.

Cast
 Maqbool Salmaan as Aby Kurishingal
 Shine Tom Chacko as Noor/Noorudheen
 Bhagath Manuel as Appu
 Govind Krishna as Kiran
 Archana Gupta as Reshmi Susan Mathew
 Shritha Sivadas as Sanjana
 Vaishali Vasu as Priya
 Sreekanth Bhasi as Jacky/Janardhanan
 Dileesh Pothan as Krishnakumar
 Reena Basheer as Molly
 Jose as Rakhavji/Rakhavan
 Pradeep as Shebin
 Sanju Bhaskar as Sanju
 Sunder as Sunder
 Kottayam Basheer as Jermiyyas

Music
The film's original soundtrack and film score was composed by Mejo Joseph. The soundtrack comprises seven songs. All songs were released by Muzik 247 in 2014.

References

External links
 

2014 films
2010s Malayalam-language films
2014 directorial debut films